Chock-A-Block is a BBC children's television programme, created by Michael Cole and Nick Wilson. It was first shown in 1981 and repeated through to 1989 and shown as part of the children's programme cycle See-Saw (the "new" name for the cycle originally known as Watch with Mother). "Chock-A-Block" was an extremely large yellow computer, modelled to resemble a mainframe of the time; it filled the entire studio and provided the entire backdrop for the show. The presenter of the show played the part of a technician maintaining the computer. There were two presenters, Fred Harris ("Chock-A-Bloke") and Carol Leader ("Chock-A-Girl"), but only one appeared in each episode. At the start of the show, the presenter would drive around the studio towards the machine in a small yellow electric car, the chock a truck, before saying the catchphrase "Chock-A-Bloke (or Girl), checking in!").

The presenter would then use the machine to find out about a particular topic. The name "chock-a-block" was derived from the machine's ability to read data from "blocks" – which were just that, physical blocks painted different colours. A typical show would include dialogue from the presenter, a brief clip played on Chock-a-block's video screen, and the presenter recording a song on Chock-a-block's audio recorder (which resembled the reel-to-reel tape drives used on actual mainframes, but with a design below to cause the reels to resemble the eyes of a smiling face).

The presenter Fred Harris went on to present the serious computing programme Micro Live and to become a personality strongly associated with computers in the public eye.

According to the Kaleidoscope 'Lost Shows' database, eight out of thirteen episodes are no longer in the BBC archives, however the whole of one of these and parts of a second survive only as domestic video recordings.

Episodes

References

External links
The Story of Chock-A-Block
 

1981 British television series debuts
1981 British television series endings
BBC children's television shows
Lost BBC episodes
Television series by BBC Studios
1980s British children's television series
British children's education television series
British television shows featuring puppetry